The American Indian Higher Education Consortium (AIHEC) was established in 1972 to represent the interests of the newly developed tribal colleges, which are controlled and operated by American Indian nations. The four founders were Gerald One Feather of the Oglala Sioux Community College, David Reisling of D-Q University, Pat Locke of the Western Interstate Commission for Higher Education (WICHE), and Helen Schierbeck of the United States Office of Education (USOE). They organized the initial meeting and brought together all who wanted to form such a national organization. . One of the most significant achievements of AIHEC was to work with the United States Congress to authorize in 1994 land-grant status to 29 tribal colleges, achieved in October 1994 under the Elementary and Secondary Education Reauthorization Act.

As a result, AIHEC is eligible to have a representative participate in the National Association of State Universities and Land-Grant Colleges' Council of Presidents. With administrative headquarters in Alexandria, Virginia.  AIHEC's membership consists of 36 tribal colleges and universities (TCUs) in the United States and one in Canada, whose first tribal college achieved independent status in 1995. The presidents jointly govern AIHEC from the member institutions. The organization offers technical assistance to its member colleges and develops institutions, and leads efforts to promote the Tribal College Movement.

In 1989, AIHEC established the American Indian College Fund (AICF) to raise scholarship funds for American Indian students at qualified tribal colleges and universities.

Mission statement
The American Indian Higher Education Consortium (AIHEC), since 1972, has been the collective spirit and voice of our nation’s Tribal Colleges and Universities, advocating on behalf of individual institutions of higher education that are defined and controlled by their respective tribal nations.  AIHEC’s mission is to nurture, advocate, and protect American Indian history, culture, art, and language, and the legal and human rights of American Indian people to their sense of identity and heritage through:

 assisting Tribal Colleges and Universities (TCUs) in maintaining standards of high-quality education, developing an accrediting body for American Indian-serving post-secondary institutions, and reaching out to other national education organizations;
 promoting and advocating for the development of new TCUs;
 promoting policy, legislation, and regulations at the national level to strengthen American Indian higher education and advocating for TCUs in Congress and with the federal government;
 providing technical assistance to member institutions;
 promoting public and private opportunities for TCUs in areas critical to success in the 21st century, including science and information technology, agriculture and natural resources use, pre-kindergarten through grade-12 linkages, international outreach, and leadership development.

Strategic goals
 Sustainability: sustain Tribal Colleges and Universities and the Tribal College Movement.
 Performance accountability: provide technical assistance, standards, and processes necessary for TCUs to be accountable to premier higher education centers within their communities. 
 Student engagement: improve the capacity of TCUs to provide high-quality, culturally relevant, and integrated higher education.   
 Strengthening communities: assist TCUs in improving their capacity to serve their students, individuals, families, and extended families.

See also
 List of tribal colleges and universities
 Tribal College Journal

References

 American Indian Higher Education Association (AIHEC) and the Institute for Higher Education Policy (1999). Tribal Colleges: An Introduction. Washington, DC: Authors.

External links
 Tribal Colleges: An Overview
 AIHEC
 Tribal College Journal (official website)
 Founding American Indian Higher Education Consortium

 
1972 establishments in the United States